Thomas Ivanios is a Metropolitan of the Malankara Orthodox Syrian Church.

Early life 
Ivanios was born on 13 December 1969.

Metropolitan 
He was elected as the Metropolitan candidate on 25 February 2022 at the Malankara Association held at Kolenchery. He was consecrated as Metropolitan on 28 July 2022 at St. Mary's Orthodox Cathedral, Pazhanji.

References

1969 births
Living people
Malankara Orthodox Syrian Church bishops